President Mason may refer to:

Politicians
Sandra Mason (born 1949), first President of Barbados

Businesspeople
Harvey Mason Jr., president of the Recording Academy
John Mason (businessman), second President of Chemical Bank
Raymond A. Mason, president of Legg Mason

Educators
Max Mason, president of the University of Chicago and the Rockefeller Foundation
Tisa Mason, president of Fort Hays State University